Lyngby station is a station on the Hillerød radial of the S-train network in Copenhagen, Denmark. It is located centrally in Kongens Lyngby. With its large bus terminal, situated on the east side of the station, it is an important hub for public transport in the northern suburbs of Copenhagen.

The station building contains a shopping arcade with circa 15 stores, including two supermarkets.

The station opened in 1863.

History
 

Lyngby Station opened on 1 October 1863 as the terminus of the first stage of Nordbanen. The small station building was designed byVilhelm Carl Heinrich Wolf. The railway was extended to Helsingør in 1864. The Lyngby-Vedbæk Railway opened in 1890. The station building was demolished in connection with the introduction of double tracks between Hellerup and Holte. A new and larger station building, located a little to the south of the old one, was built in 1890–91 to design by Heinrich Wenck and N.P.C. Holsøe.

The rail line was electrified and converted S-train service in 1936. The terminus of the Lyngby-Vedbæk Railway was also moved to Jægersborg. The old station building was demolished in 1956.

Building
Lyngby Bypass runs along the roof of the station building which is located on the east side of the railway tracks. The building contains a 200 metre long shopping arcade with circa 15 shops with a total floor area of 8,369 square metres. In 2012, DSB Ejendomme acquired the shopping arcade from Lyngby-Taarbæk Municipality. It was subsequently refurbished with the assistance of Gottlieb Paludan Architects. The shopping arcade was acquired by Nordic Real Estate Partners (NREP) in 2014. Stores include two Fakta and Netto supermarket, a Matas and a Lagkagehuset bakery.

See also
 List of railway stations in Denmark

References

External links

S-train (Copenhagen) stations
Railway stations opened in 1863
Railway stations in Denmark opened in the 19th century